The 2015 Marbella Cup was held in February 2015 in Marbella, Spain.

Teams
  Clube Atlético Paranaense
  FC Dinamo București
  IF Elfsborg
  FC Lokomotiv Moscow

Standings

Matches

External links
Official site
https://web.archive.org/web/20140203052811/http://footballimpact.com/Marbella%20Cup/index.html

2015
2014–15 in Bulgarian football
2014–15 in Romanian football
2015 in Swedish football